Jeffrey Katz may refer to:

 Jeff Katz, American film producer and comics author
 Jeffry Katz (born 1943), American music producer